Nádraží Veleslavín may refer to:

 Praha-Veleslavín railway station
 Nádraží Veleslavín (Prague Metro)